Wolverhampton Wanderers Football Club, commonly known as Wolves, is a professional football club based in Wolverhampton, England, which competes in the . The club has played at Molineux Stadium since moving from Dudley Road in 1889. The club's traditional kit consists of old gold shirts and socks with black shorts. Since 1979, the kit has also featured the club's "wolf's head" logo. Long-standing rivalries exist with other clubs from the West Midlands, the main one being the Black Country derby contested with West Bromwich Albion.

Formed as St. Luke's F.C. in 1877, the club changed name to Wolverhampton Wanderers two years later and became one of the founding members of the Football League in 1888. They won the FA Cup for the first time in 1893, and again as a Second Division team in 1908 following the club's relegation two years previously. They fell to the third tier in 1923, but went on to win the Third Division North in 1923–24 and the Second Division in 1931–32. The team was crowned English League champions three times – in 1953–54, 1957–58 and 1958–59 – all under the management of Stan Cullis. Wolves also won another two FA Cup finals, in 1949 and 1960. Relegated in 1965, after 26 consecutive seasons in the top flight, they secured promotion back to the First Division in 1966–67. Wolves won the League Cup in 1974 and 1980, and again won the Second Division title in 1976–77.

Wolves suffered a financial crisis during the early-1980s recession that led to the club coming close to liquidation in 1982. In the five seasons between 1981–82 and 1985–86 Wolves were relegated four times (although there was also one promotion in 1982–83), meaning the club ended up in what was then the Football League Fourth Division (now EFL League Two) for the first (and so far only) time in the club's history. However, the club immediately started a swift turn-around, and having been beaten in the inaugural Football League play-off final in 1987, Wolves won the Fourth Division and Football League Trophy titles in 1987–88, followed by the Third Division title in 1988–89. 

After fourteen seasons in the second tier between 1989 and 2003, Wolves reached the Premier League, founded in 1992, for the first time with victory in the 2003 play-offs, though they were relegated after a single season in the top division on this occasion. Wolves won the Championship in 2008–09 to return to the Premier League, but endured relegation in 2011–12, followed by relegation again (to EFL League One) in 2012–13. The club then returned to the Premier League after first winning the League One title in 2013–14, followed by another Championship title in 2017–18.

After becoming one of the first British clubs to install floodlights at its home ground in 1953, Wolves arranged televised "floodlit friendlies" against leading overseas club sides between 1953 and 1956, which were instrumental in the launch of the European Cup (now known as the UEFA Champions League) in 1955. Wolves reached the quarter-finals of the competition in 1959–60 as well as the semi-finals of the 1960–61 European Cup Winners' Cup and the inaugural UEFA Cup Final in 1972. Following a 39-year absence from UEFA competitions, they reached the UEFA Europa League quarter-finals in 2020.

History

Formation and the Football League (1879–1893)
In the 2000 edition of The Rough Guide to English Football, the history section on the Wolves page begins: "The very name Wolves thunders from the pages of English football history". As with several other clubs, Everton for example, Wolves had humble beginnings shaped by the twin influences of cricket and the church. The club was founded in 1877 as  St. Luke's F.C. by John Baynton and John Brodie, two pupils of St Luke's Church School in Blakenhall, who had been presented with a football by their headmaster Harry Barcroft. The team played its first-ever game on 13 January 1877 against a reserve side from Stafford Road, later merging with the football section of a local cricket club called Blakenhall Wanderers to form Wolverhampton Wanderers in August 1879. Having initially played on two strips of land in the town, they relocated to a more substantial venue on Dudley Road in 1881, before lifting their first trophy in 1884 when they won the Wrekin Cup, during a season in which they played their first-ever FA Cup tie. Having become professional, the club were nominated to become one of the twelve founder members of the Football League in 1888, in which they played in the first round of Football League fixtures ever staged, against Aston Villa on 8 September 1888. They ended the inaugural season in third place, as well as reaching their first FA Cup Final, losing 0–3 to the first "Double" winners, Preston North End. At the conclusion of the campaign the club relocated for a final time when they moved to Molineux, then a pleasure park known as the Molineux Grounds.

FA Cup success and world war years (1893–1950)

Wolves lifted the FA Cup for the first time in 1893 when they beat Everton 1–0, and made a third FA Cup Final appearance in 1896. The club added a second FA Cup Final triumph (a 3–1 win against Newcastle United) to their 1893 success in 1908, two years after having dropped into the Second Division for the first time. After struggling during the years either side of the First World War to regain their place in the top division (a period that was punctuated by another FA Cup Final appearance in 1921), the club suffered a further relegation in 1923, entering the Third Division (North), which they won at the first attempt. Eight years after returning to the Second Division, Wolves regained their top-flight status as Second Division Champions under Major Frank Buckley after twenty-six years away. With Buckley at the helm the team became established as one of the leading club sides in England in the years leading up to the Second World War, as they finished runners-up in the league twice in succession (1937–38 & 1938–39), as well as reaching the last pre-war FA Cup Final, in which they suffered a shock defeat to Portsmouth. In 1937–38 Wolves came within a whisker of winning the club's first English league title: a win in the side's last game away to Sunderland would have clinched things, but in the event Wolves lost 0–1 and thus ended the campaign one point behind the eventual champions, Arsenal. One of the things Major Buckley and his Wolves side attracted a lot of attention for in the last two full seasons prior to the suspension of league football during the Second World War was Buckley's insistence that his players be injected with monkey gland extract to enhance their stamina and performance, a practice that the Football League disapproved of but did not prohibit.

When league football resumed after the Second World War, Wolves suffered yet another final day failure in the First Division. Just as in 1938, victory in their last match would have won the title but a 2–1 loss to title rivals Liverpool meant that Liverpool were crowned champions instead. This game had been the last in a Wolves shirt for Stan Cullis, and a year later he became manager of the club. In Cullis's first season in charge, he led Wolves to a first major honour in 41 years as they beat Leicester City to lift the FA Cup, and a year later, only goal average prevented Wolves winning the league title.

The Stan Cullis era (1950–1960)
The 1950s were by far the most successful period in the club's history. Captained by Billy Wright, Wolves finally claimed the league championship for the first time in 1953–54, overhauling local rivals West Bromwich Albion late in the season. Two further titles were soon won in successive years (1957–58 and 1958–59), as Wolves vied with Manchester United to be acknowledged the premier team in English football at that juncture. Wolves were renowned both for the club's domestic success and for the staging of high-profile "floodlit friendlies" against other top club sides from around the world. Wolves had become one of the first club sides in Britain to invest in floodlighting in 1953 at a cost of £10,000 (£281,308.64 at 2019 prices). Perhaps the most famed of these friendlies saw Wolves defeat a Honvéd side including many members of the Hungarian national team that had recently humbled England twice, leading the national media to proclaim Wolves "Champions of the World". This became the final spur for Gabriel Hanot, the editor of L'Équipe, to propose the creation of the European Cup (later rebranded as the UEFA Champions League). Wolves were one of the first British clubs to participate. In the 1957–58 season, Wolves defeated Real Madrid 5–4 (3–2 in Wolverhampton and 2–2 in Madrid) in home and away friendlies.

Cup success in the '60s and '70s (1960–1980)

The 1960s began with a fourth FA Cup victory and Wolves almost achieved the first League and FA Cup 'double' of the 20th century in English football. They were pipped to the league title by a point on the final day of the season by Burnley. Despite that bright start to the decade, the 1960s saw Wolves begin to decline. After finishing as league runners-up in 1959–60 and a creditable third-place league finish in Tottenham Hotspur's 'double'-winning season, the team faded and Cullis himself was sacked after sixteen years in post in September 1964 after a disastrous start to the 1964–65 season. Cullis's sacking did not prevent the season ending with relegation (the first time Wolves had known relegation since 1922–23) and the club's first spell outside the top division since 1932. Exile from the top flight lasted only two seasons however, as Wolves were promoted in 1967 as Second Division runners-up.

During the close season in 1967, Wolves played a mini-season in North America as part of the fledgling United Soccer Association league which imported clubs from Europe and South America. Playing as the "Los Angeles Wolves", they won the Western Division and ultimately the championship by defeating the Eastern Division champions Washington Whips (import of Aberdeen) in a final decider.

The club's return to the English top flight in 1967 heralded another period of relative success under Bill McGarry, with a fourth place league finish in 1971 qualifying Wolves for the newly created UEFA Cup. En route to the UEFA Cup final, they defeated Juventus and Ferencváros before losing to Tottenham Hotspur 3–2 on aggregate; a 2–1 home defeat in the first leg proving decisive. Wolves lifted silverware two years later when they won the League Cup for the first time by beating Manchester City 2–1 in the final. Despite relegation again in 1976, Wolves bounced back at the first attempt as Second Division champions under manager Sammy Chung, and then under manager John Barnwell, the turn of the decade saw them finish in the top six in the league and win the 1980 League Cup, when then-record signing Andy Gray scored the only goal of the final to defeat the reigning European champions and League Cup holders Nottingham Forest.

Financial crisis, decline and recovery (1980–1990)
The multi-million pound rebuilding of the Molineux Street Stand in 1979 was to be the catalyst for the club's near-financial ruin during the next decade. Plunging match attendances in the early-1980s, at least partly due to recession in both the national and local economies, and consequent difficulties in repaying the loans taken out to fund the new John Ireland Stand, led the club to receivership and relegation in 1982. The club was saved from liquidation at the last minute when it was purchased by a consortium fronted by former player Derek Dougan. Initially this takeover, financed by two Saudi brothers, Mahmud and Mohammad Bhatti of the company Allied Properties, brought immediate promotion back to the First Division under manager Graham Hawkins, but the Bhattis' failure to invest sufficiently in the club soon saw things unravel as the team suffered three consecutive relegations through the football divisions under different managers, as well as the almost-constant threat of the club being wound-up.

In 1986, with the club again in receivership, a deal saw Wolverhampton City Council purchase the stadium and surrounding land, while a local developer paid off the club's outstanding debts in return for planning permission to develop the land adjacent to the stadium. The 1986–87 season saw Wolves' first-ever campaign in the Fourth Division, where, with the guidance of new manager Graham Turner and the goals of Steve Bull, who would ultimately score a club record 306 goals, the team reached the final of the inaugural play-offs but were denied promotion by Aldershot. Building on that, the team achieved both the Fourth and Third Division championships in the next two seasons and won the 1988 Football League Trophy Final at Wembley.

The Hayward years (1990–2007)

Lifelong fan Jack Hayward purchased the club in 1990 and immediately funded the extensive redevelopment of a by then dilapidated Molineux into a modern all-seater stadium. With work completed in 1993, Hayward redirected his investment onto the playing side in an attempt to win promotion to the newly formed Premier League. Despite substantial spending, neither Graham Taylor nor Mark McGhee could fulfil this, both managers leading the team to play-off defeats at the semi-final stages in 1995 and 1997 respectively. It was not until 2003 that Wolves were promoted, when they defeated Sheffield United 3–0 in the play-off final under Dave Jones to end a 19-year absence from the top level. Their stay proved short-lived however as they were immediately relegated back to the newly retitled EFL Championship.

Promotion, relegations and turbulent times (2007–2016)
After former England manager Glenn Hoddle failed to bring a swift return to the Premier League, the rebuilding of the squad by Mick McCarthy rejuvenated the club with an unexpected play-off finish. The club was bought from Sir Jack Hayward by Steve Morgan in 2007 and two years later the team returned to the Premier League as 2008–09 Football League Championship title winners. Wolves successfully battled relegation for two seasons before McCarthy's dismissal in the 2011–12 season, which precipitated relegation under his former assistant Terry Connor, who was promoted to replace McCarthy.

Following relegation, Norwegian Ståle Solbakken became the club's first overseas manager but his tenure lasted only six months before a poor run of results saw him replaced by Dean Saunders in January 2013. Saunders failed to bring any upturn, culminating in both the club's relegation to EFL League One, a level the club had not played at since 1989, and Saunders's own dismissal. Following this, Kenny Jackett was appointed in May 2013 in the retitled position of head coach, and led the team back to the EFL Championship in his first season, setting a new club record points total of 103 which is also an all-time record for the most points accumulated by any team during a Tier 3 season.

Fosun Era: Return to the Premier League and continental football (2016–present)
On 21 July 2016, it was confirmed that the Chinese investment group Fosun International had bought the club's parent company, W.W. (1990) Ltd, from Steve Morgan and his own company Bridgemere Group for a reported £45 million, with Jez Moxey stepping down from his role as a CEO and replaced by managing director Laurie Dalrymple. Days later, the new regime announced that Kenny Jackett's contract with the club had been terminated and former Italian international Walter Zenga was appointed head coach. Zenga was sacked after just 14 league games and Paul Lambert appointed as his successor in November 2016 but, at the conclusion of the season, Lambert too was dismissed, with former FC Porto boss Nuno Espírito Santo replacing him. Under Nuno, Wolves went on to clinch the 2017–18 EFL Championship title and return to the Premier League after a 6-year absence.

Wolverhampton Wanderers's return to the Premier League resulted in a 7th-place finish, their highest position in the top division since finishing 6th in 1979–80. As a result of that season's league winners Manchester City winning both that season's EFL Cup and FA Cup, this position also earned them a spot in the qualification rounds of UEFA Europa League, thus invoking their first continental campaign since 1980–81. They entered the second qualifying round where they won 6-1 on aggregate against Crusaders of Northern Ireland, won 8-0 on aggreagate against Pyunik of Armenia in the third qualifying round and won 5–3 on aggregate against Torino in the play-off round to advance to the group stage. There, they were drawn to play Slovan Bratislava, Braga and Beşiktaş home and away between September and December 2019. Finishing as runners-up to Braga in the group stage, they defeated La Liga team Espanyol 6–3 on aggregate in the Round of 32 and Olympiacos of Greece 2–1 on aggregate in the Round of 16 over two legs (12 March 2020 and 6 August 2020) to reach the quarter-final stage. In the quarter-finals, Wolves lost to that season's eventual winners Sevilla 0–1 on 11 August 2020 in a modified single-leg tie played in a neutral venue in Germany due to the COVID-19 pandemic in Europe. Wolves replicated their previous season's 7th-place finish in the Premier League in 2019–20 but with two more points and only missed out on a return to continental competition, both on goal difference and Arsenal winning that season's FA Cup.

Wolves suffered a difficult 2020–21 season which was played almost entirely without crowds due to the COVID-19 pandemic. The club lost their talismanic striker Raúl Jiménez to a season-ending injury (a fractured skull) in an away game at Arsenal on 29 November 2020, and subsequently struggled for goals for the remainder of the campaign. Wolves finished the season in 13th place with 45 points. The club announced on 21 May 2021 that head coach Nuno Espírito Santo would leave the club "by mutual consent" after the final game of the season against Manchester United on 23 May 2021. 

On 9 June 2021 Wolves announced the appointment of former Benfica head coach Bruno Lage as Espírito Santo's replacement. The 2021–22 season was a mixed one for Wolves under Lage: after losing the first three games 1–0, the team's fortunes improved significantly to the point that the team were seventh in the league by the end of January which handed Lage that month's Premier League Manager of the Month award and within touching distance of fourth place, but the season petered out with only two points being taken from the last seven fixtures and finished in 10th place with 51 points. As with the previous season, goal-scoring proved problematic for Wolves, with only 38 goals in 38 games for an average of a goal per game. 

Wolves parted company with or sacked Bruno Lage on 2 October 2022 after eight games of the 2022–23 season with only one win and just three goals scored, ending his tenure after 16 months. On 5 November 2022 it was announced that Wolves would appoint former Real Madrid, Spain and Sevilla manager Julen Lopetegui as head coach, effective 14 November 2022. Due to the 2022 FIFA World Cup, Lopetegui's first competitive match in charge of Wolves turned out to be an EFL Cup match against Gillingham on 20 December 2022, a match that Wolves won 2–0.

Colours and badge

The club's traditional colours of gold and black allude to the city council's motto "out of darkness cometh light" with the two colours representing light and darkness respectively. Although the team's original colours upon formation were red and white, adopted from the school colours of St Lukes, for much of their history their home colours have been their distinctive old gold shirts with black shorts.

In the early decades of the club a variety of shirt designs using these colours were created, including stripes and diagonal halves, until the continual usage of a plain shirt design since the 1930s. Before the 1960s a darker shade of gold was used, known as "old gold", which is still often cited in the media as the club's colour.

Like most English teams, their earliest shirts usually only featured a badge on special occasions such as cup finals. The first such badge to be worn on Wolves shirts was the coat of arms of Wolverhampton City Council. In the late 1960s, Wolves introduced their own club badge that appeared on their shirts consisting of a single leaping wolf, which later became three leaping wolves in the mid-1970s. Since 1979 the badge has consisted of a single "wolf head" design; the current badge was last redesigned in 2002.

In May 2019, the club won a legal challenge by Peter Davies, a 71 year old retired building industry manager, who claimed he drew the wolf head motif as a schoolboy in the 1960s and entered it in an art competition. Mr Davies said he came up with the angular design after a teacher asked him to demonstrate an understanding of Blaise Pascal's Hexagrammum Mysticum Theorem, and entered it in an art competition advertised in the Express and Star newspaper. Mr Davies had made a copyright claim and wanted compensation. Mr Davies lost his copyright infringement claim and now faces legal fees and costs estimated to be about £450,000.

Wolves' traditional away colours have been all-white, but recent decades have seen a variety of colours used, including black, blue, teal, purple and maroon.

Stadium

Former grounds
When first founded the club used a field on Goldthorn Hill in the Blakenhall area as its home, which could accommodate some 2,000 spectators. In 1879 they relocated to John Harper's Field on Lower Villiers Street where they remained for two years before a short move to Dudley Road, with the new ground situated opposite the Fighting Cocks Inn. It was here that they played their first FA Cup tie in 1883 and their first Football League fixture in September 1888. Although the site could only hold 2,500 spectators at first it was eventually developed to be capable of 10,000.

Molineux

In the summer of 1889 the club moved to its permanent home ever since, Molineux, in the Whitmore Reans area of the city. The stadium name originates from the Molineux House built in the area by Benjamin Molineux, a local merchant, in the 18th century and whose grounds were later developed to include numerous public leisure facilities. When the Northampton Brewery Company purchased these grounds in 1889, they rented their use to the city's football club, who were seeking to find a home more befitting a Football League member. After renovating the site, the first ever official game was staged on 7 September 1889 before a crowd of 4,000. The ground was capable of hosting 20,000 spectators, although English football crowds rarely reached that number in the 19th century.

Wolves bought the freehold in 1923 and soon began a series of ground improvements under the auspices of Archibald Leitch, beginning with the construction of a major grandstand on the Waterloo Road side. In 1932, the club also built a new stand on the Molineux Street side and followed this by adding a roof to the South Bank two years later; this South Bank was historically the second largest of all Kop ends in the country and regularly held crowds in excess of 30,000. The stadium finally now had four complete stands that would form its basis for the next half-century.

In the days before seating regulations, the ground could hold more than 60,000 spectators, with the record attendance being 61,315 for a First Division match against Liverpool on 11 February 1939. The 1940s and 1950s saw average attendances for seasons regularly exceed 40,000, coinciding with the club's peak on the field. During this time Molineux became one of the first British grounds to install floodlights, enabling it to host a series of midweek friendlies against teams from around the globe. In the days prior to the formation of the European Cup and international club competitions, these games were highly prestigious and gained huge crowds and interest with the BBC often televising such events.

When the Molineux Street Stand failed to meet new safety legislation, the club began building a new replacement stand behind the existing one on land where housing had been demolished. This new all-seater stand – named the John Ireland Stand after the then-club president – was completed in 1979 and was the first stage of a plan to rebuild the entire stadium. The cost of the Ireland Stand escalated to over £2 million and plunged the club into a financial crisis. As a result, it was forced to enter receivership in 1982. By the time the team dropped into the Fourth Division in 1986, only the John Ireland Stand and the South Bank terrace remained in use. New safety laws were implemented following the Bradford City stadium fire and these forced the closure of both the now-dilapidated North Bank and Waterloo Road Stand. The club did not have the funds necessary to rebuild them.

Following the takeover of the club by Sir Jack Hayward in 1990, £8.5 million of funding was made available to redevelop Molineux comprehensively. Between August 1991 and December 1993 three sides of the stadium were completely rebuilt to form a 28,525 capacity all-seater stadium that complied with the Taylor Report: the Waterloo Road Stand was replaced by the Billy Wright Stand, the North Bank terrace by the Stan Cullis Stand, and the South Bank terrace by the Sir Jack Hayward Stand (named the Jack Harris Stand until 2015). Aside from the addition of a temporary seating area in the southwest corner used during Wolves' seasons in the Premier League; this redevelopment formed the stadium for almost twenty years.

In 2010, plans were unveiled for an extensive redevelopment programme to enlarge the capacity and develop the facilities. The first stage of this saw a new two-tier Stan Cullis Stand become fully operational for the 2012–13 season, raising the current official capacity to 31,700. The proposed second stage concerned the rebuilding of the oldest stand at the stadium (built in 1979 as the John Ireland Stand and renamed the Steve Bull Stand in 2003) to increase capacity to around 36,000, but this and any further work was shelved when it became likely that the club would be relegated from the Premier League in 2012.

Ground redevelopments were once again placed on the agenda following the club's acquisition by Fosun in 2016. In contrast to previously mooted plans, it was publicly revealed in February 2019 that future plans consisting of the demolition and full rebuild of the Steve Bull Stand, followed by the redevelopment of the Sir Jack Hayward Stand, to raise the stadium capacity to 45-46,000, were under active consideration. However, in 2020 the club announced more modest plans for making gradual improvements to the stadium as the club seeks to retain its unique character, and enable prioritisation of investment in the playing side of the club.

Players

First-team squad

Out on loan

Development squad and Academy

Wolverhampton Wanderers Under-23s are competing in Division 2 of the Premier League 2 during the current season, following relegation from the highest level after the previous season was curtailed and decided on a point-per-game basis. The team qualifies as an entrant in Premier League 2 by virtue of Wolves's academy holding Category 1 status. Although the league is designed for players aged 23 and below, three overage players may also feature. Home games are primarily staged at Kidderminster Harriers' Aggborough home.

Wolves Women

Originally founded in 1975, Wolves Women became the club's official women's team in 2008. They currently play at the third level of English women's football in the FA Women's National League North. Their home games are played at the CKW Stadium in the Castlecroft area of the city.

Player of the Year

Source:

Club officials

Football staff
 First-team manager:  Julen Lopetegui
 First-team assistant manager:  Pablo Sanz
 First-team coach:  Edu Rubio
 First-team coach:  Juan Peinado
 First-team goalkeeping coach:  Tony Roberts
 First-team fitness coaches:  Oscar Caro,  Borja De Alba Alonso
 First-team technical advisor:  Fran Garagarza
 First-team performance analyst:  Daniel Lopetegui
 Under-23 head coach: James Collins
 Under-18 head coach:  Steve Davis
 Medical staff
 Head of medical services:  Matt Perry
 Club doctor:  Kai Win
 First-team physiotherapist:  Ollie Leaper
 First-team sports therapist:  Danny Fishwick
 First-team therapist:  Rui Fuste
 Soft-tissue therapist: Matt Wignall

Club executives
 Owner: Fosun International
 Executive Chairman: Jeff Shi
 Technical Director: Matt Hobbs
 General Manager – Football Operations: Matt Wild
 General Manager – Commercial Operations: Vinny Clark
 General Manager – Marketing & Commercial Growth: Russell Jones
 Non-Executive Directors: John Bowater and John Gough
 Honorary Vice-Presidents: Steve Bull, Ron Flowers and Robert Plant

Former players and managers

Notable players
For details on all former players, see List of Wolverhampton Wanderers F.C. players

The club has been represented by numerous high-profile players over the years, most notably Billy Wright, who captained England a record 90 times and was the first player to win a century of international caps, as well as earning the Footballer of the Year Award (in 1952), an accolade also won by Wolves half-back Bill Slater in 1960. In total, 36 players have won full England caps during their time with Wolves, including the club's current captain Conor Coady as well as the club's record goalscorer Steve Bull, who was the last of the club's England internationals to play in a major tournament.

Andy Gray, Emlyn Hughes, Paul Ince and Denis Irwin are all previous League Championship medal winners who have also represented Wolves. Joleon Lescott went on to play for England 26 times scoring once. Robbie Keane went on to become Ireland's all-time leading goalscorer with 68 goals in 146 appearances.

The Wolverhampton Wanderers Hall of Fame has inducted the following former players:

  Mike Bailey
  Peter Broadbent
  Steve Bull
  Stan Cullis
  Derek Dougan
  Malcolm Finlayson
  Ron Flowers
  Johnny Hancocks
  Billy Harrison
  Kenny Hibbitt
  Jackery Jones
  John McAlle
  Jimmy Mullen
  Andy Mutch
  Derek Parkin
  John Richards
  Bill Slater
  Roy Swinbourne
  Andy Thompson
  Dave Wagstaffe
  Bert Williams
  Billy Wright

Managerial history

Wolves have had 32 different (permanently appointed) managers during the club's existence. The first manager, George Worrall, was identified by the title of "club secretary", a post that continued until the appointment of a full-time manager in the modern sense was made in 1922.

The club's most successful manager is Stan Cullis, whose 16-year tenure brought all three of Wolves' league championships as well as two FA Cup triumphs. Two other managers have been inducted into the Club Hall of Fame: Major Frank Buckley and Graham Turner. Turner oversaw two successive divisional championship wins in the late-1980s, winning the Fourth Division title in 1987-88 and the Third Division title the following season. Bill McGarry and John Barnwell both won the League Cup for Wolves in the 1970s and 1980s.

In the 21st century, Dave Jones, Mick McCarthy and Nuno Espírito Santo have led the club into the Premier League. Kenny Jackett took Wolves to a record EFL League One (Tier 3) points haul of 103 as they won this division in 2013–14.

Ståle Solbakken became Wolves’ first foreign manager under Steve Morgan’s ownership, followed later by Walter Zenga, two Portuguese managers Nuno Espirito Santo and Bruno Lage and current manager Julen Lopetegui who is Spanish, under current owners Fosun.

Wolves have also been managed by two former England national team managers in Graham Taylor and Glenn Hoddle.

Support
As well as having numerous supporters' clubs across the United Kingdom, Wolverhampton Wanderers also have an international support base, with supporters' clubs in Australia, United States, Sweden, Spain, Germany, Republic of Ireland, Malta, Iceland and Norway amongst others. They have a particularly sizeable Scandinavian fanbase, due to the area's television coverage of Midlands football in the 1970s when the club were a regular top-flight team; the first-ever English match shown live in both Sweden and Norway involved Wolves (Wolverhampton Wanderers 1 Sunderland 0, Football League First Division, Saturday 29 November 1969).

Rivalries

Wolves' longest-established and strongest rivalry is with West Bromwich Albion, against whom the club contest the Black Country derby. The two clubs, separated by eleven miles, have faced each other 162 times; their first competitive clash being an FA Cup tie in 1886. A national survey by the football pools found the rivalry to be the strongest in English football. Both clubs are founder members of the Football League and the two once contested the league title in 1953–54, with Wolves finishing as champions.

Wolves also share rivalries with the two Birmingham clubs, Aston Villa and Birmingham City, against whom there have been numerous matches dating back to the 19th century. Wolves' closest geographic rival is actually Walsall but, as they have rarely competed at the same level, it is of less significance. As Wolverhampton historically sat within the boundaries of Staffordshire, a Staffordshire derby between Wolves and Stoke City is also recognised.

The 2018–19 Premier League season was the first and only time ever that Wolves were the sole representatives of the West Midlands in the top flight of English football. The 2020–21 Premier League season saw Wolves play against both Aston Villa and West Bromwich Albion, but Albion's relegation at the end of that season means that Aston Villa is Wolves' only West Midlands rival in the Premier League in 2021–22 and 2022–23.

Fan culture
During the club's peak in the 1950s, the home crowd's signature song was "The Happy Wanderer", which was a chart hit in the U.K. in 1954 when Wolves first won the league title.  In more recent times, "Hi Ho Silver Lining" – a 1967 rock song by Jeff Beck with its chorus modified to "Hi Ho Wolverhampton!" – has become a staple feature of home games. "The Liquidator" instrumental by the Harry J. Allstars was also popularly used in the stadium until a request from the West Midlands Police to cease due to concerns that the obscene lyrics used by some fans during the chorus could incite trouble.

The club attracted a number of hooligans in the 1960s. During the late 1970s and early 1980s, a hooligan firm named "The Subway Army" would often ambush fans in the subway adjacent to the ground. The group was gradually broken up and virtually ceased to exist due to a large number of arrests – many as part of the police's nationwide "Operation GROWTH" (or "Get Rid of Wolverhampton's Troublesome Hooligans") in the late 1980s.

The club invites interaction with its supporters and has a Fans' Parliament, at which independently selected candidates meet with club officials discuss issues relating to the club. An independent fanzine named "A Load of Bull" (ALOB), in part a reference to leading goalscorer Steve Bull, published supporters' views between 1989 and 2012.

Ownership and finances
The club is owned by the Chinese conglomerate group Fosun International, which purchased the parent company of the club, W.W. (1990) Ltd., on 21 July 2016 for a reported £45 million from previous owner Steve Morgan and his company Bridgemere Group. In the last published accounts of Wolves' group parent company (covering the 2018–19 Premier League season), a pre-tax profit of just under £20 million was recorded, with turnover for the year equalling £172.5m. £92.1 million was spent on staff wages and costs.

Like most football clubs, significant commercial income is generated from shirt sponsorship deals. Past shirt sponsorship deals were as follows: Tatung (1982–86), Benjamin Perry (1986), Staw Distribution (1986–88), Manders Paint & Ink (1988–90), Goodyear (1990–2002), Doritos (2002–04), Chaucer Consulting (2004–09), Sportingbet (2009–13), What House? (2013–15), Silverbug (2015–16), The Money Shop (2016–18) and W88 (2018–19). The club's current affiliation is with the betting website ManBetX, who signed a "long term" sponsorship deal in June 2019.

Fosun bought Wolves from Steve Morgan, who had taken ownership in August 2007 for a nominal sum of £10 with the proviso that £30 million was injected into the club, ending an almost four-year search for a new buyer. Morgan oversaw nine full seasons, but placed the club on the market for new owners in September 2015. Morgan had bought the club from Sir Jack Hayward, a lifelong fan of the club, who had himself purchased it in 1990 for £2.1 million. During his tenure Sir Jack invested an estimated £50 million of his personal wealth to rebuild the club's stadium and fund new players, but the team only achieved one season in the top flight during his 17 years at the helm despite this increased spending power.

Hayward's takeover greatly improved the club's financial health, after a turbulent 1980s in which the club twice was declared bankrupt. In 1982 the club was "saved" from liquidation when it was purchased by two Saudi brothers, Mahmud and Mohammad Bhatti, as part of their company Allied Properties. However, their failure to sufficiently invest in the club saw it face several winding-up orders as well as successive relegations through the football divisions. In 1986 the official receiver was again called in and a deal eventually brokered for Wolverhampton City Council to purchase the club's stadium for £1.12 million, along with the surrounding land, while a local developer, Gallagher Estates, in conjunction with the Asda supermarket chain, agreed to pay off the club's outstanding debts in return for the building of an Asda superstore on land adjacent to the stadium.

Honours

In the all-time table since the league's inception in 1888, Wolves sit fourth in terms of points gathered in all divisions (as of the conclusion of the 2018–19 season), with only Manchester United, Liverpool and Arsenal having accumulated more points in total. Wolves were the first side to win all four divisions of the English professional game and have won every competition currently contested in English domestic football.

League 
First Division / Premier League (Tier 1)
 Champions (3): 1953–54, 1957–58, 1958–59
 Runners-up: 1937–38, 1938–39, 1949–50, 1954–55, 1959–60

Second Division/Championship (Tier 2)
 Champions (4): 1931–32, 1976–77, 2008–09, 2017–18
 Runners-up: 1966–67, 1982–83
 Play-off winners (1): 2002–03

Third Division/League One (Tier 3)
 Champions (3): 1923–24 (North), 1988–89, 2013–14

Fourth Division (Tier 4)
 Champions (1): 1987–88

Cups 
UEFA Cup/UEFA Europa League
Runners-up (1): 1971–72
USA Cup 1967
 Champions

FA Cup
 Winners (4): 1892–93, 1907–08, 1948–49, 1959–60
 Runners-up (4): 1888–89, 1895–96, 1920–21, 1938–39

Football League Cup
 Winners (2): 1973–74, 1979–80

FA Charity Shield
 Winners (4): 1949*, 1954*, 1959, 1960* (* shared)
 Runners-up (1): 1958

Football League Trophy
 Winners (1): 1987–88

Football League War Cup
 Winners (1): 1942

Texaco Cup
 Winners (1): 1970–71

League history

Wolverhampton Wanderers was a founder member of the Football League in 1888. The 2022–23 season is Wolves' 124th in the Football League system. Wolves have spent 117 of their 123 seasons to date within the top two tiers of English football. Wolves played in the third tier on four occasions, each occasion lasting just one season; three of these seasons ended with promotion back to the second tier as Champions, and one ended in relegation to the fourth tier. The club has played two seasons in England's fourth tier (in the 1980s).

Notes

References

External links

 Official Wolverhampton Wanderers F.C. site
 Club profile at BBC Sport

 
1877 establishments in England
Association football clubs established in 1877
Sport in Wolverhampton
Football clubs in the West Midlands (county)
Football clubs in England
FA Cup winners
EFL Cup winners
EFL Trophy winners
The Football League founder members
Former English Football League clubs
Premier League clubs
United Soccer Association imported teams
Fosun International